Lobariella robusta is a species of foliose lichen in the family Peltigeraceae. Found in Hawaii, it was formally described as a new species in 2017 by lichenologists Robert Lücking  Bibiana Moncada and Clifford Smith. Here, in a mesic habitat with open-landscaped parkland, the lichen grows on tree trunks. It is only known to occur at the type locality. Secondary chemicals that are found in the lichen include pseudocyphellarin A, 4-O-methyl-gyrophoric acid, and gyrophoric acid. The specific epithet refers to the "rather robust, leathery thallus".

References

Peltigerales
Lichen species
Lichens described in 2017
Lichens of Hawaii
Taxa named by Robert Lücking
Fungi without expected TNC conservation status